Karl Kanep (1 December 1883 Rannu Parish (now Elva Parish), Kreis Dorpat - 30 March 1935 Tartu) was an Estonian politician. He was a member of the IV Riigikogu, representing the Estonian Workers' Party. He was a member of the Riigikogu since 24 March 1930. He replaced Oskar Tork.

References

1883 births
1935 deaths
People from Elva Parish
People from Kreis Dorpat
Estonian Workers' Party politicians
Members of the Riigikogu, 1929–1932